Marathon is a town in the Canadian province of Ontario, located in Thunder Bay District, on the north shore of Lake Superior north of Pukaskwa National Park, in the heart of the Canadian Shield.

Geography
Personal residences encompass an area starting from Lake Superior, and stretch out to a new subdivision near Penn Lake, an in-town campsite and beach in the eastern portion of the town. The Pic River is outside of the town's eastern limits.

The town is adjacent to Peninsula Harbour and has several coves including Carden Cove, Sturdee Cove and Craddock Cove; all three are west-northwest of Marathon.  Penn Lake is a local lake within the town where tourists can enjoy camping and water sports.

Heron Bay is a town located to the south of Marathon, and shares the post office and phone prefix. The Pic River First Nation is on the outskirts of Pukaskwa National Park.

Demographics

Economy and transportation
Marathon's resource economy was built on pulp, most recently managed by Marathon Pulp Inc. On February 12, 2009, Marathon Pulp Inc. announced an indefinite shutdown that eliminated hundreds of jobs from the region, and negatively impacted Marathon's tax base and its local economy.

Starting in the mid-1980s Marathon's economy expanded to include gold mining. The Hemlo Operations included three gold mining operations: Williams, David Bell and Golden Giant mines. In 2009, Vancouver-based Teck Cominco mining company sold its 50% share of Williams and David Bell to its investing partner, Barrick Gold Corporation, while Golden Giant was decommissioned in 2005. Golden Giant mine is now owned by Barrick Gold Corporation, and is now part of David Bell mine.

Marathon is the centre of commerce for the rural region in which it is situated.  It boasts the largest indoor shopping mall between Thunder Bay and Sault Ste. Marie, and one of only three Canadian Tire department stores in the region.

Education
Marathon is served by five schools. Three of these are public schools: Margaret Twomey Public School, Marathon High School, and École Secondaire Cité-Supérieure.  Two are Roman Catholic separate schools: Holy Saviour School and École Val-des-Bois.

Recreation and tourism
Marathon has a children's park named after Del Earle, one of the town's founders.

There are numerous hotels in the town, including Travelodge, Harbour Inn and the Zero 100 Motor Inn.

Marathon has a challenging 9 hole golf course, Cross-country skiing trails and down hill skiing (now closed), a 4-sheet curling venue (now closed), and the only indoor swimming pool between Thunder Bay and Sault Ste. Marie.

Recent developments in the town include a new skatepark, basketball courts and the refinishing of the tennis courts.

Culture and the arts
Marathon's art and culture community has varied over time.

Marathon has been home to a community entertainment series, a community choir, coffee houses & culture jams, a writer's group, an art gallery, house concerts, frequent dinner theatres, art and photography displays, quilting groups and shows, a ceramics club, annual craft shows, and numerous art classes.

A summer music series, known as "Concerts in the Parking Lot", was inaugurated in July 2006 and is held in the town centre on Wednesday evenings in summer.  This casual series encompasses a variety of musical genres, and showcases talent both local and from "away".

In 2010, Marathon was one of the many Canadian communities that the Vancouver 2010 Winter Olympics Torch Relay passed through.

Community groups and services 
Marathon is served by numerous organizations and services. These include, among many others, the Cub Scouts, Salvation Army, Girl Guides, Victim Services, and the Royal Canadian Air Cadets.

Climate
Marathon has a warm-summer humid continental climate (Köppen: Dfb), with its position north of Lake Superior the climate is attenuated, mainly the southern heatwaves, due to the hot air masses already have crossing the entire lake. It is noted differences with Thunder Bay, for example, keeping winters still rigorous but warm summers and sometimes cool.

A weather station was run in the town from 1950 to 1983.  Data is sparse.  The data presented below is from a short-lived station at nearby Terrace Bay.

See also
List of francophone communities in Ontario

References

External links

Mining communities in Ontario
Municipalities in Thunder Bay District
Single-tier municipalities in Ontario
Towns in Ontario
Populated places on Lake Superior in Canada